Clara Perez is a film and television actress.

Biography
Perez was born in Caracas, Venezuela. She was raised in Caracas; Charlotte, Vermont (USA); and Lincolnshire, England. Perez trained as at the Webber Douglas Academy in London.

Clara Perez has made appearances in a total of 5 films and 2 television series, in 3 episodes.

Filmography
Christmas Eve (2015) - Amelia
2 Graves (2009) - Cherry
The Bill (2008) - Consuela Perez
Heroes and Villains (2006) - Jessica
Running Scared (2006) - Conchita
Eva (2005) - Eva
Sea of Souls (2005) (TV series) - Maria (2 episodes)

External links
 

Venezuelan stage actresses
Venezuelan television actresses
Venezuelan people of British descent
Venezuelan emigrants to the United States
American film actresses
American television actresses
Actresses from California
Alumni of the Webber Douglas Academy of Dramatic Art
Living people
People from Caracas
Venezuelan film actresses
Year of birth missing (living people)
21st-century American women